Te cunosc de undeva! (translation: I know you from somewhere!) is the Romanian version of the talent show, Your Face Sounds Familiar. The first series premiered on 17 March 2012 on Antena 1. The show is hosted by Cosmin Seleși and Alina Pușcaș.
Its panel of judges includes Andreea Bălan, Ozana Barabancea, Aurelian Temișan and Cristi Iacob.

Format
The show challenges celebrities to perform as different musical artists every week, which are chosen by its "Randomiser", and they are judged by a celebrity panel. Each celebrity performs a song-and-dance routine associated with a particular singer. The randomiser can choose an older or younger artist, one of the opposite sex (except during week one) or a deceased singer.

Voting
Contestants are awarded points from the judges (and each another) based on their singing and dancing. Each public vote triggers donations to eight charities.

Judges award points (up to 12 each, for a possible grand total of 48) to the contestants, who have five points to give to a contestant of their choice. These bonus points are awarded after all the contestants have performed. The total score of each contestant is the sum of the judges' and contestants' votes and the televotes. The winning contestant at the end of the each show receives €1000 to donate to a charity of their choice, and a €15,000 grand prize is awarded to the series champion in the final week.

Contestants
Forty-one contestants have competed. Two have competed in two seasons, five in three seasons, and Maria Buză in four.

Italicized contestants have participated in the most-recent season.

Color key:
 Winner
 Runner-up
 Third place
 Fourth place (qualified for the final)
 Fourth place (did not qualify)
 First elimination of the season

CRBL, Maria Buză, Jorge and Lora returned for season two.
Anda Adam, Pepe and Maria Buză returned for season four.

Season results

Overview

Season one (2012)
The show debuted on 17 March 2012 and ended on 26 May. Judges were pop singer Aurelian Temișan, singer and dancer Andreea Bălan, soprano Ozana Barabancea and actor Andrei Aradits. The winner was singer-dancer CRBL, who defeated Lora in the final. CRBL received a cheque for €15,000.

Season two (2012)
The second season began on 15 September 2012 and ended on 1 December, with all four judges returning. The winner was singer, dancer and television presenter Jorge, who received a cheque for €15,000. Lora was runner-up for the second time.

Season three (2013)
The third season began on 16 February 2013 and ended on 11 May, with all four judges returning. The winner was singer and TV host Pepe, who received a cheque for €15,000. Simona Nae was the runner-up.

Season four (2013)
The series' fourth season began on 7 September 2013, with all four judges returning. The winner was again Pepe, with Maria Buză the runner-up.

Season five (2014)
The fifth season began in 2014, and the judges were Andrei Aradits, Monica Anghel, Pepe and Delia. New contestants were Nicole Cherry, Raluka, Andreea Bănică, Elena Ionescu, Alex Mațaev, Doru Todoruț, Florin Ristei and Alex Velea. During the season Delia changed places with Horia Brenciu, and the season winner was Alex Velea.

Season six: All-Stars (2014)
The sixth season began on 13 September 2014, with the original judges returning by popular demand. For the All-Star season, contestants were chosen for their previous performances. They were: CRBL, Lora, Pepe, Maria Buză, Florin Ristei, Rona Hartner, Jorge and Anda Adam. Five contestants, instead of the usual four, appeared in the final: Jorge, Lora, Pepe, Maria Buză and Rona Hartner. The winner of the all-star season was Maria Buză.

Season seven (2015)
The seventh season started on 14 February 2015 with the same judges and hosts. There were nine new contestants and one returning player: soloists Oana Sârbu, Alina Eremia, Lidia Buble, Cezar Ouatu, Daniel Iordăchioaie, Liviu Vârciu and the groups Bambi (Raluca and Denisa Tănase) and Alb-Negru (Andrei Ștefănescu and Kamara). The winner was the opera singer Cezar Ouatu, and pop singer Alina Eremia was the runner-up.

Hosts and judges

On 16 March 2012, actor and television presenter Cosmin Seleși and actress-model Alina Pușcaș were confirmed as hosts for the first season; they are known for their humor and spontaneity. Singer Aurelian Temișan, dancer Andreea Bălan, soprano Ozana Barabancea and actor Andrei Aradits were confirmed as judges. In season five, Bălan, Barabancea and Temișan changed places with Pepe, Monica Anghel and Delia. Before Season 17, however, Cosmin Selesi ended his contract with the Antena Group and therefore gave his place as presenter of Te Cunosc de Undeva to Pepe.

Awards and nominee
For three consecutive years, from 2012 to 2014, TV Mania gave Te cunosc de undeva! its award for best entertainment show.

References

2012 Romanian television series debuts
Antena 1 (Romania) original programming
Te cunosc
2010s Romanian television series
Romanian reality television series